

Season summary
Ajax participated in the Eredivisie, the KNVB Cup and the UEFA Champions League in the 1996–97 season.

Ajax finished 4th the Eredivisie.

Ajax finished the Champions League 2nd in group phase. Ajax beat Atletico Madrid in the quarter finals but beaten by Juventus in the semi-finals.

Ajax is beaten by Heracles Almelo in the 2nd round in KNVB Cup.

First-team squad
Squad at end of season

Results

UEFA Champions League games

Group stage 

Ajax won 4-3 on aggregate.

Juventus won 6-2 on aggregate.

References

AFC Ajax seasons
AFC Ajax